is a professional Japanese baseball player. He plays pitcher for the Yokohama DeNA BayStars.

External links

 NPB.com

1996 births
Living people
Baseball people from Niigata Prefecture
Japanese baseball players
Nippon Professional Baseball pitchers
Yokohama DeNA BayStars players